Ripley  is the unofficial name given to an impact crater on Pluto's moon Charon. It is named after the heroine Ellen Ripley in the science-fiction/horror film Alien.

References

Alien (franchise)
Impact craters on Charon